Roosville is an unincorporated community and United States Port of Entry on the Canada–United States border in Lincoln County, Montana, United States, at the terminus of US Highway 93. The locality on the Canadian side of the border is also named Roosville and is the southern terminus of British Columbia provincial highway 93.

References

Unincorporated communities in Lincoln County, Montana
Unincorporated communities in Montana